Purdham is a surname, and may refer to:

Garry Purdham (1978–2010), English professional rugby league player
Rob Purdham (born 1980), English professional rugby league player
Mary Ellen Kimball-Purdham (born 1929), All-American Girls Professional Baseball League player